Edmund Reigle (June 19, 1924 — November 20, 2003) was a Canadian professional ice hockey player and coach. Reigle playing career, which lasted from 1944 to 1957, was mainly spent in the minor leagues. He also played 17 games in the National Hockey League for the Boston Bruins during the 1950–51 season. After retiring as a player, Reigle became a coach, coaching the Sweden national team between 1957 and 1960, including the 1960 Olympics and later coached West Germany at the 1968 Winter Olympics.

Career statistics

Regular season and playoffs

References

External links
 

1924 births
2003 deaths
Boston Bruins players
Canadian expatriates in the United States
Canadian ice hockey defencemen
Cleveland Barons (1937–1973) players
Detroit Metal Mouldings players
Hershey Bears players
Indianapolis Capitals players
Germany men's national ice hockey team coaches
Kildonan North Stars players
Omaha Knights (USHL) players
Oshawa Generals players
Ice hockey people from Winnipeg
Sweden men's national ice hockey team coaches